Jeff Hutcheson (born April 15, 1954 in Toronto, Ontario) is a former Canadian weather and sports anchor for Canada AM.

He started his career in 1976 at CFRB as a "good news" reporter, during his first year in college. His next work was with CKCO-TV in Kitchener, Ontario, where he was a sports anchor, reporter, producer, television host and writer from 1976 to 1997. Hutcheson then became substitute sports/weather host on Canada AM in 1992 until 1997. For a short time in 1997, Jeff Hutcheson was the morning host of News Talk 570, leaving shortly after. On September 1, 1998, he began reporting on sports and weather full-time on Canada AM.

He has also published two travel books, Best of Canada and Best of Atlantic Canada.

External links 
 CTV.ca biography of Jeff Hutcheson

Canadian television meteorologists
Canadian television sportscasters
Canadian television producers
Canadian travel writers
Living people
1954 births
CTV Television Network people
Canadian sports journalists